The Eighteen Lesser Texts, known as the Patiṉeṇkīḻkaṇakku in the literature, is a collection of eighteen poetic works mostly created during the 'post Sangam period' (between 100 and 500 CE). The poems of this collection differ from the earlier works of the Eighteen Greater Texts (Patiṉeṇmēlkaṇakku), which are the oldest surviving Tamil poetry, in that the poems are written in the venpa meter and are relatively short in length. Naladiyar, having sung by 400 poets, is the only anthology in this collection. Each of the remaining works of the Eighteen Lesser Texts is sung by a single poet. Unlike the works of the Eighteen Greater Texts, most of the books of the Eighteen Lesser Texts deal with morals and ethics.

Works of the "Eighteen lesser books" collection
The Eighteen Lesser Texts contains the following books:

 Nālaṭiyār 	
 Nāṉmaṇikkaṭikai
 Iṉṉā Nāṟpatu 	
 Iṉiyavai Nāṟpatu
 Kār Nāṟpatu 	
 Kaḷavaḻi Nāṟpatu
 Aintiṇai Aimpatu
 Tiṉaimoḻi Aimpatu
 Aintinai Eḻupatu
 Tiṉaimalai Nūṟṟu Aimpatu
 Tirukkuṛaḷ
 Tirikaṭukam
 Ācārakkōvai
 Paḻamoḻi Nāṉūṟu
 Ciṟupañcamūlam
 Mutumoḻikkānci
 Elāti
 Kainnilai

See also
 Eighteen Greater Texts
 Sangam literature
 List of historic Indian texts

References

Further reading
 Varadarajan, M,  First International Conference Seminar of Tamil Studies, Kuala Lumpur, Malaysia, April 1966.

External links
 Patinenkilkkanakku – Works on Akam theme, a translation of seven works by Prof. A. Dakshinamurthy (Thiruchirapalli: Bharathidasan University, 2010)

Tamil-language literature